Tiger Thompson is a 1924 American silent Western film directed by B. Reeves Eason featuring Harry Carey.

Cast
 Harry Carey as Tiger Thompson
 Marguerite Clayton as Ethel Brannon
 John Webb Dillion as Jim Morley (credited as John Dillon)
 Jack Richardson as Bull Dorgan
 George Ring as Charlie Wong

See also
 Harry Carey filmography

External links

 
 

1924 films
1924 Western (genre) films
American black-and-white films
Films directed by B. Reeves Eason
Films distributed by W. W. Hodkinson Corporation
Silent American Western (genre) films
1920s American films
1920s English-language films